Gaepo-dong is a ward of Gangnam-gu in Seoul, South Korea, south of Dogok-dong and Daechi-dong. Gaepodong is divided into three "dong": Gaepo 1, 2, and 4 dong. Gaepo 3-dong had been merged with Gaepo 2-dong in 2009.

Education
Schools located in Gaepo-dong
 Daejin Elementary School
 Gaeil Elementary School
 Gaepo Elementary School
 Gaewon Elementary School
 Kuryong Elementary School
 Seoul Poi Elementary School
 Yangjon Elementary School
 Gaepo Middle School
 Gaewon Middle School
 Kuryong Middle School
 Gugak National High School
 Gaepo High School
 Kyunggi Girls' High School
 Sudo Electric Technical High School
 Korea International School

The Japanese School of Seoul was previously in Gaepo-dong. Circa 2010 it moved to Digital Media City.

Local Community
Gae-po Public Library

Attraction
Yangjaecheon
Gaepodong Green Park

Notable people from Gaepo-dong
 Jeon So-yeon (Hangul: 전소연), South Korean singer-songwriter, rapper, dancer, record producer and K-pop idol, leader and member of K-pop girlgroup (G)I-dle.

See also 
Dong of Gangnam-gu
Administrative divisions of South Korea
Poi-dong

References

External links
 Gaepo 1-dong resident center site
Gangnam-gu map

Neighbourhoods in Gangnam District